Rangitata Island is a long lens-shaped island in the delta of the braided Rangitata River in Canterbury, New Zealand, approximately halfway between Timaru and Ashburton, New Zealand. Low lying, it is mostly fertile farmland.

One of the country's largest delta islands, it is also the only one crossed by State Highway 1 (at the island's northern end), and the only place where the highway leaves both of the country's two main islands. It is also crossed by the Main South Line railway, and once had a small station, which was closed in 1962.

Rangitata Island Aerodrome is located just east of the State Highway 1 bridges, on Brodie Road, just off the Rangitata Island Road. The private field is available for public use and has two vectors. The field is the home of the Geraldine Flying Group.

The airfield also houses a collection of older microlight aircraft, as well as assorted aircraft parts, airframes and items of interest.

References

External links
NZ AIP vol 4: NZRI - Rangitata Island Aerodrome
Rangitata Island Aerodrome

River islands of New Zealand
Timaru District
Islands of Canterbury, New Zealand